Tergar Osel Ling Monastery or Tergar Lungrik Osel Targyé Ling Monastery is a Tibetan Buddhist monastery in Kathmandu, Nepal of the Tergar Meditation Community.

History
The Tergar Osel Ling Monastery was founded in Kathmandu, Nepal by Tulku Urgyen Rinpoche. His son Tsoknyi Rinpoche has overseen the monastery's operations and introduced studies for non-Tibetans. Under his leadership it has "thrived and grown into a mature sangha of dedicated practitioners." Another son, Yongey Mingyur Rinpoche, a fully ordained monk, has formally overseen the monastery since 2010. He also opened a shedra, a monastic college in February 2010. His brother, Tsoknyi Rinpoche, has continued to be closely involved in the community. He has been quoted as saying: "Simply let experience take place very freely, so that your open heart is suffused with the tenderness of true compassion."

In 2011 Mingyur Rinpoche, a best selling author, left the monastery for a traveling retreat expected to last 3 years or more.

Overview
The monastery is a Tibetan Buddhist monastery located on the outskirts of Kathmandu. More than 100 Himalayan monks study Buddhist meditative practices and philosophical inquiry at the monastery.

See also
 Ka-Nying Shedrub Ling, also founded by Tulku Urgyen Rinpoche

References

Buddhist monasteries in Nepal
Tibetan Buddhist monasteries
Religious buildings and structures in Kathmandu
Tibetan Buddhism in Nepal